Jean-Pierre Barboni (born 6 September 1958) is a retired Luxembourgian football midfielder.

References

1958 births
Living people
Luxembourgian footballers
Jeunesse Esch players
Association football midfielders
Luxembourg international footballers
Luxembourgian football managers
Jeunesse Esch managers